Aeroflot Flight 2415 ( Reys 2415 Aeroflota) was a regularly scheduled passenger flight from Moscow to Leningrad that crashed shortly after takeoff on 28 November 1976.  The cause of the accident was attributed to crew disorientation as a result of artificial horizon failure in low visibility conditions.

Aircraft 
The aircraft involved in the accident was a Tupolev Tu-104B registered СССР-42471 to Aeroflot-Russian Airlines.  The aircraft rolled off the final assembly line of the Kazan Aircraft Production facility on 22 February 1960 and was delivered to the Ministry of Civil Aviation on 24 March 1960.  In the aircraft's sixteen years of operation it accumulated 22,199 flight hours and 13,336 pressurization cycles.

Crew 
On board the plane were six crew members, of which four were cockpit crew and two were cabin crew.

The cockpit crew consisted of:
 Captain Boris Nikolaevich Gorokhovsky, (Russian: Борис Николаевич Гороховский) serving as the pilot in command
 Co-pilot Igor Borisovich Nikolaev, (Russian: Игорь Борисович Николаев)
 Navigator Vladimir Viktorovich Gusev (Russian: Владимир Викторович Гусев)
 Flight engineer Vladimir Grigorevich Vasiliev (Russian: Владимир Григорьевич Васильев)

Sequence of events 

Flight 2415 took off from Moscow-Sheremetyevo International Airport despite bad weather at 6:53 local time. On board the plane were the six crew members as well as 67 passengers, including four children. After takeoff the pilots reduced engine power and radioed the control tower for instructions to proceed. The crew was instructed to head on a bearing of 265°;  the pilots performed the maneuver by setting the ailerons for banking to the right. After banking 265° the aircraft continued to bank to the right, losing altitude and picking up speed in the process, putting the aircraft into a steep dive. The plane crashed into the ground  from the airport, exploding on impact and killing all passengers and crew aboard the plane.

Causes 
The State Supervisory Commission for Flight Safety board cited among the causes of the crash included failure of the artificial horizon, poor visibility from the cockpit, and lack of warnings indicating the failure of the artificial horizon.  Due to the damage to the aircraft caused by the crash, it was impossible to determine if the ailerons were functioning correctly at the time.  The cockpit voice recorder and flight data recorders were both missing the last six seconds of data, presumably as result of the damage in the post-crash fire.  The board concluded that the crew demonstrated excellent calm in the emergency in their efforts to fly with incorrect data from the aircraft; weather was not determined to be a primary cause of the crash.  It is worth noting that one member of the board, Markov, disagreed with the findings of the report and attributed the accident to pilot error;  but he was overruled by Gosavianadzor who sided with the rest of the board.

See also

Aeroflot Flight 964, also a Tupolev Tu-104, crashed on approach experiencing similar artificial horizon failure.
Aeroflot Flight 3932, another Tupolev Tu-104, crashed shortly after takeoff experiencing similar artificial horizon failure.
Aeroflot Flight 1912, another Tupolev Tu-104 accident caused by similar instrument failure.

References

Aviation accidents and incidents in 1976
Aviation accidents and incidents in the Soviet Union
2415
1976 in the Soviet Union
Accidents and incidents involving the Tupolev Tu-104
Airliner accidents and incidents caused by instrument failure
November 1976 events in Europe